Álvaro Beltrán (born October 15, 1978), is a Mexican professional racquetball player. Beltrán is the current International Racquetball Federation (IRF) World Champion in Men's Doubles with Daniel De La Rosa, winning the title in 2022 in San Luis Potosi, Mexico. He is one of only two men to win both Men's Singles and Men's Doubles at the  Racquetball World Championships. His six world titles (1 singles & 5 doubles) tie him for 3rd most in IRF history. Beltran has been a top 10 player on the International Racquetball Tour (IRT) for 18 seasons.

Professional career
Beltrán has been the highest ranked Mexican player ever on the IRT. He's been ranked in the top 10 IRT at season's end in 18 seasons since 2000-01, finishing as high as #2 as of October 2014. He won his first IRT event in 2013 when he defeated fellow Mexican Daniel De La Rosa in the final of the Red Swain Shootout. Beltran's second win came in November 2015 at the Galaxy Custom Printing Pro-Am in Atlanta, where he defeated Rocky Carson, in the final, 11-8, 8-11, 11-5, 11-4.  Overall, Beltrán has been in 35 finals in 178 appearances on tour, which is 6th most all time.

Beltrán has been in the finals of the US Open Racquetball Championships twice: once in 2010 and again in 2014. He was the first Mexican to do so. He lost both finals to Kane Waselenchuk but did win the first game of 2010 final, which was Waselenchuk's first loss of a game in six US Open finals. 2010 final was the first US Open final with two non-American players.

Also of note, Beltrán is one of only two players to beat IRT #1 Waselenchuk in a completed match, since Waselenchk's return to the IRT tour in the fall of 2008. That win occurred at the 2009 California Open when Beltrán defeated Waslenchuk in four games in the semi-finals.

International career
Beltrán is the only racquetball player to win World Championships in both Men's Singles and Men's Doubles. Beltrán won Men's Singles at the 2000 Racquetball World Championships hosted by the International Racquetball Federation in San Luis Potosi, Mexico, defeating American Rocky Carson in the final. He has won Men's Doubles thrice, all with Javier Moreno. Most recently, he and Moreno won the 2016 Worlds Championships in Cali, Colombia, where they defeated Americans Jake Bredenbeck and Jose Diaz in the final, 15-12, 15-9. Beltran and Moreno first won Men's Doubles in 2006, defeating Americans Carson and Jack Huczek in the final, and then six years later in 2012, defeating Americans Tony Carson and Jansen Allen. Both those wins were in Santo Domingo, Dominican Republic.

Beltrán and Moreno also won the gold medals in doubles at  2003, and 2011 Pan Am Games. In 2003, they beat Americans Ruben Gonzalez and Mike Guidry in the final, and in 2011 final, defeated Venezuelans Cesar Castillo and Jorge Hirsekorn. Beltrán also won gold in the team competition at the 2011 Pan Am Games.

In addition, Beltrán won three consecutive Pan American Championships in Men's Singles from 2007–2009, and the 2015 Pan Am Championship in Men's Doubles with Javier Moreno. He is a two time the gold medalist in Men's Singles at the Central American and Caribbean Games, as he defeated countrymen Gilberto Meija in 2010 final and Daniel De La Rosa in 2014 final, 15-7, 15-2.

In 2018, Beltrán and Rodrigo Montoya captured gold at the Pan American Championships in Temuco, Chile by defeating Bolivians Roland Keller and Conrrado Moscoso in the final, 13-15, 15-10, 11-6.

References

External links
IRT website

Living people
1978 births
Mexican racquetball players
Racquetball players at the 2011 Pan American Games
Sportspeople from Tijuana
Racquetball players at the 2015 Pan American Games
Pan American Games gold medalists for Mexico
Pan American Games bronze medalists for Mexico
Pan American Games medalists in racquetball
Central American and Caribbean Games gold medalists for Mexico
Competitors at the 2010 Central American and Caribbean Games
Racquetball players at the 1999 Pan American Games
Racquetball players at the 2003 Pan American Games
Racquetball players at the 2019 Pan American Games
Central American and Caribbean Games medalists in racquetball
Medalists at the 2011 Pan American Games
Medalists at the 2015 Pan American Games
Medalists at the 2019 Pan American Games